René Gosse (16 August 1883 – 22 December 1943) was a French mathematician and resistant during the Second World War.

1883 births
1943 deaths
École Normale Supérieure alumni
French Resistance members
French Section of the Workers' International politicians
French mathematicians
People from Hérault
People murdered in France
Recipients of the Croix de Guerre 1914–1918 (France)